Refrain Club (자제단) was a Korean civic group and self-governing body club, founder of Park Jung-yang and Yun Phil-oh, Lee Chin-ho. It was founded by the Anti-March 1st Movement. Refrain club's Korean spelling is Chachedan and Chache Club (자제단, 자제회). 

In March 1919, Japan ruled Korea. Korean independence movements such as March 1st Movement resisted the occupation. The Refrain group opposed the effort, including all violence. The club disbanded in December 1919.

See also
 March 1st Movement
 Park Jung-yang
 Yun Phil-oh

External links
 Refrain club 
 Refrain club 
 친일중의 친일 ‘3·1운동 자제단’은 누구? The Hangeorye  2010.03.01
 "일제가 현대 조선 개신" 해방후에도 망발…친일파 박중양 e-Daegumail 2010.11.25

References 

Korean collaborators with Imperial Japan